Tomonotus ferruginosus, the oak-leaf grasshopper, is a species of band-winged grasshopper in the family Acrididae. It is found in Central America and North America.

References

Oedipodinae
Articles created by Qbugbot
Insects described in 1905